Ahuntsic is a district in Montreal, Quebec, Canada

Ahuntsic may also refer to:

Places
 Ahuntsic-Cartierville, a borough of the city of Montreal 
 Ahuntsic (electoral district) 
 Ahuntsic (provincial electoral district)

Transit
Ahuntsic station (RTM), in Montreal, Quebec, Canada
Ahuntsic station (Via Rail), former station in Montreal, Quebec, Canada
 Ahuntsic Bridge

Other uses
 Ahuntsic (missionary) (died 1625), Huron Christian missionary
 Collège Ahuntsic